Highbury is a suburb of north London, England.

Highbury may also refer to:

Australia 

Highbury, Queensland, a locality in the Shire of Mareeba
Highbury, South Australia
Highbury, Western Australia
Highbury, Centennial Park, a heritage-listed private house in Sydney

Canada 

Highbury Avenue in London, Ontario

New Zealand 

 Highbury, Palmerston North, suburb of Palmerston North
 Highbury, Auckland, suburb of Auckland
 Highbury, Wellington, suburb of Wellington

South Africa 

 Highbury Preparatory School, a boys' school in Hillcrest

United Kingdom 

Arsenal Stadium, located in Highbury, London, was often also referred to simply as Highbury
 Highbury, Hampshire, an area of Portsmouth
Highbury, Somerset, a location
Highbury, Birmingham, a mansion in Birmingham, West Midlands
Highbury Stadium, Fleetwood, a football stadium in Lancashire
Highbury C.C., a cricket club which was based in Leeds, between 1946 and 2004